Communist League was a small (now defunct) political communist party in Sweden, connected to the Socialist Workers Party of the United States, and distributor of  the Militant  and part of the Pathfinder organization. 

The Communist League was formed in 1989 by a group of members who broke away from Socialistiska Partiet, with the aim of creating a more proletarian-based party. Members are encouraged to take traditional working class jobs. Although the party is not particularly old, it claims continuity from the Russian October Revolution and the ideas of Lenin and Trotsky.

External links
The Militant
Pathfinder Books
Defunct communist parties in Sweden
Political parties with year of disestablishment missing
Political parties with year of establishment missing
1989 establishments in Sweden
Political parties established in 1989